This table provides summary of comparison of various MIDI enhancement standards by various parameters.

Notes

References 

 
 
 , an extensive guide to various models and their capabilities
 GM modules for the masses, a comparison article

MIDI standards